Josef A. Käs (born on 14 October, 1961) is a German biophysicist, currently occupied as a full professor at Leipzig University (German: Universität Leipzig). Josef A. Käs's research mainly focuses on soft matter physics of cancer. More recently (updated in the year of 2023), he has significantly contributed to cancer cell unjamming.

Life and work 
Josef Alfons Käs studied at the Technische Universität München, where he also completed his PhD thesis about the reptation model in polymer physics in 1993. From 1993 to 1996, he was a postdoctoral fellow at Harvard Medical School in the lab of Prof. Paul Janmey, before he became assistant, associate and then full professor at the University of Texas at Austin from 1996 to 2002.

In 2001, Josef A. Käs and Jochen Guck invented the Optical Stretcher, a tool for the contact-free investigation of cell rheology using pure light forces.
In the same year, he was also awarded the Wolfgang Paul Award, the highest scientific prize in Germany at that time, by the Alexander von Humboldt Foundation of the Alexander von Humboldt Foundation
Consequently, he became full professor at Leipzig University in 2002 and head of the Institute for Experimental Physics I in 2008 (until 2016).

He is one of the organizers of the annual Physics of Cancer conferences in Leipzig (website: Physics of cancer conference) and co-founder of RS Zelltechnik, a company that made optical stretchers commercially available.

Fellowships and Awards 
 ICMB Fellow, Institute of Molecular Biology, University of Texas at Austin (1999–2001)
 Distinguished Lecturer, SigmaXi (2000–2003)
 Wolfgang Paul Award, Alexander von Humboldt Foundation (2002)
 Finalist, Saatchi & Saatchi Award for World Changing Ideas (2006)
 American Physical Society Fellow (since 2014)
 Full member of Saxon Academy of Sciences (since 2014)
 Woolmer Lecture, Institute of Physics and Engineering in Medicine, UK (2017)

Previous/Current Position(s) 
 Postdoc, Harvard Medical School, (supervisor: Prof Paul Janmey) (1993-1996)
 Assistant professor, Department of Physics, University of Texas at Austin (1996–2000)
 Member, Center for Nonlinear Dynamics, University of Texas at Austin (1996–2002)
 Assistant professor, Institute for Cellular and Molecular Biology, University of Texas at Austin (1996–2002)
 Assistant professor, Department of Physics, University of Texas at Austin (2000–2001)
 Full-professor, Department of Physics, UUniversity of Texas at Austin (2001–2002)
 Director, Peter Debye Institute for Soft Matter Physics, Faculty of Physics Geosciences, Leipzig University, Germany (2008–2016)
 Full-professor (C4), Faculty of Physics and Geosciences, Leipzig University, Germany (since 2002)
 Head, Division for Soft Matter Physics, Peter Debye Institute for Soft Matter Physics, Faculty of Physics and Geosciences, Leipzig University, Germany (since 2002)
 Member, Leipzig University Cancer Center (since 2016)

References

External links 
Homepage of Josef A. Käs
Physics of cancer conference website
RS Zelltechnik homepage

Fellows of the American Physical Society
1961 births
German biophysicists
Living people